Silverland: A Winter Journey Beyond the Urals is a book by Irish author Dervla Murphy. It was first published by John Murray in 2006.

References

External links
 

2006 non-fiction books
John Murray (publishing house) books
Books by Dervla Murphy